Rinegg was a municipality in the district of Murau in Styria, Austria. It was merged into Ranten on 1 January 2015.

References

Cities and towns in Murau District